Streptomyces aidingensis is a Gram-positive, aerobic bacterium species from the genus of Streptomyces, which has been isolated from sediments of the Aiding Lake in Tulufan Basin in north-west China.

See also 
 List of Streptomyces species

References

Further reading

External links
Type strain of Streptomyces aidingensis at BacDive -  the Bacterial Diversity Metadatabase

aidingensis
Bacteria described in 2013